Hanna Samson is a Polish psychologist, journalist, feminist and writer.  She works as a hotline worker in the Feminoteka Foundation where she provides psychological advice and support to women who suffer violence. Hanna Samson conducts group therapy in the Center of Leadership Education Foundation. 

She used to be a writer in Polish magazines for women Twój Styl. Samson works in magazines "Sens" and "Business Class" and publishes in a monthly women magazine "Zwierciadło" and a weekly women magazine "Wysokie Obcasy".

Books 
 1996: Zimno mi, mamo
 2000: Pułapka na motyla
 2001: 7 opowiadań o miłości i jedno inne
 2004: Miłość. Reaktywacja
 2005: Wojna żeńsko-męska i przeciwko światu. Wyd. II. Warszawa: Wydawnictwo Czarna Owca, 2011. . (pol.)
 2006: Pokój żeńsko-męski na chwałę patriarchatu
 2007: 7 grzechów przeciwko miłości
 2009: Flesz. Zbiorowy akt popświadomości
 2010: Ja, prezydenta i inne głosy
 2012: Życie po mężczyźnie

References 

Year of birth missing (living people)
Living people
Polish psychologists
Polish women psychologists
Polish feminists
Polish non-fiction writers
21st-century Polish women writers